The Gutian Congress or Gutian Conference was the 9th meeting of the 4th Red Army and the first after the Nanchang Uprising and the subsequent southward flight of the rebel troops. It was convened in December 1929 in the town of Gutian in Shanghang County, Fujian Province.

Most of the delegates to this congress were army men (the insurrectionists having been renamed the 4th Army of the Chinese Workers' & Peasants' Red Army). Mao Zedong, voted out six months earlier but moving from his success at the little-known Jiaoyang Congress (also in Shanghang), addressed the Zhu-Mao 4th Army as its Comintern-anointed political commissar and chaired the congress.

The Gutian Congress Resolution, also titled On Correcting Mistaken Ideas in the Party (henceforth Mistaken Ideas), has its ostensible source at the Gutian Congress. One of the selections from this significant text later included in Mao's Little Red Book is as follows: 
In the sphere of theory, destroy the roots of ultra-democracy. First, it should be pointed out that the danger of ultra-democracy lies in the fact that it damages or even completely wrecks the Party organisation and weakens or even completely undermines the Party's fighting capacity, rendering the Party incapable of fulfilling its fighting tasks and thereby causing the defeat of the revolution. Next it should be pointed out that the source of ultra-democracy consists in the petty bourgeoisie's individualistic aversion to discipline. When this characteristic is brought into the Party, it develops into ultra-democratic ideas politically and organisationally. These ideas are utterly incompatible with the fighting tasks of the proletariat.

Mistaken Ideas also defined the Red Army as a "mass propaganda" (qunzhong xuanchuan) organ in addition to being a military fighting force. It entrenched the absolute leadership position of the Communist Party over the Red Army. The purpose of the Red Army, the resolution stated, "was chiefly for the service of political ends." The resolution further called for the criticism of what was seen as excessive democratic deliberation and discussion in the fighting force ("ultra-democracy"), preferring democratic centralism whereby the minority agreed to abide by the decisions of the majority, lower levels unquestioningly implemented decisions made by the leadership, and that mistaken ideas must be "corrected through ideological criticism."

See also 
 New Gutian Conference, held by Xi Jinping in 2014

References

Citations

Sources 

 Quotations from Chairman Mao Tse-tung, Lin Biao, ed., East is Red Publishing (Beijing, 1964, April), pp. 309–11.

Military history of Fujian
1929 in China
1929 in politics
1929 conferences
Major National Historical and Cultural Sites in Fujian
Assemblies of the Chinese Communist Party